Rodney Carlyle McNeill (born March 26, 1951 in Durham, North Carolina) is a former American football running back. Drafted by the New Orleans Saints in 1974, he spent two seasons with them before playing for the Tampa Bay Buccaneers in 1976. In the inaugural 1976 Tampa Bay Buccaneers season, he was the team's kick returner and running back.

External links
Pro-Football-Reference
Image of USC tailback Rod McNeill scoring a touchdown in a game vs Oregon State, 1972. Los Angeles Times Photographic Archive (Collection 1429). UCLA Library Special Collections, Charles E. Young Research Library, University of California, Los Angeles.

1951 births
Living people
American football running backs
New Orleans Saints players
Tampa Bay Buccaneers players
USC Trojans football players